Marie-Sophie L. (born Marie-Sophie Pochat; 14 February 1963) is a French actress and entrepreneur.

Life 
Marie-Sophie L. played her first roles in the theater in 1984. Claude Lelouch cast her in important characters in several of her films. She was also active on television beginning 1994.

She discovered the Raw Food movement while in California, and trained at the Living Light Culinary Arts Institute in Fort Bragg. In France, she created L'instant Cru in 2013, relying on a website that broadcasts videos, recipes and online courses.

In 2015, she published a cookbook, L'instant Cru, and in 2018, Raw Food, published by Albin Michel.

Works 

 L'instant Cru, Paris: Albin Michel, 2015. , 
 Raw Food, 2018

References

External links 

https://www.linstantcru.com/

Living people
Year of birth missing (living people)
Place of birth missing (living people)
20th-century French actresses
21st-century French actresses
French film actresses
French television actresses
French cookbook writers
Women cookbook writers